The Jade Faced Assassin is a 1971 Hong Kong film adapted from Gu Long's novel Juedai Shuangjiao. The film was directed by Yan Jun, produced by the Shaw Brothers Studio, and starred Lily Ho and Kao Yuen as the lead characters.

Plot
The swordsman Zhang Zhen is injured in a misadventure and rescued by Eldest Sister of Changchun Sect, who has a crush on him. However, Zhang falls in love with the maid Yuenu instead, and conceives twins with her. The couple are killed by a group of evil pugilists later. The Eldest Sister is angry with Zhang Zhen for not accepting her and plans to make Zhang's children kill each other as revenge. The baby girl (Xiaolu'er) is saved by Zhang's friend, Lian Lanyan, while the male infant (Hua Yuchun) is taken away by the Eldest Sister. Lian Lanyan encounters the Ten Villains when he passes through Villains' Valley. He is overwhelmed by them and knocked out in a fight. The baby Xiaolu'er is taken away by the Villains, who surprisingly do not harm her, and instead intend to groom her to become the greatest villain ever. Eighteen years later, the twins meet each other by coincidence.

Cast
Lily Ho as Xiaolu'er (Xiaoyu'er)
Kao Yuen as Hua Yuchun (Hua Wuque)
Ku Feng as Lian Lanyan (Yan Nantian)
Fan Mei-sheng as Yuchi Zhou Guang
Cheung Poi-san as Zhang Zhen (Jiang Feng)
Angela Pan as Xie Xinchan
Irene Chen as Yuenu
Essie Lin Chia as Eldest Sister (Yaoyue)
Chai No as Black Face
Yan Jun as Lan Cunxiu
Law Hon as Smiling Sword Master
Hoh Ban as Master Chin
Shum Lo as Heaven Full of Stars Master
Tong Tin-hei
Liu Wai
Wong Ching-ho
Tsang Chor-lam
Yee Kwan
Chui Chung-hok
Hsu Hsia
Suen Lam
Tam Bo
Nam Wai-lit
Chin Chun
Hao Li-jen
Chu Gam
Lau Kar-wing
Yuen Cheung-yan
Wong Chung
Wong Ching
Wang Dan
Kwan Yan
Man Lei
Ho Bo-sing
Chan Siu-gai
Kwok Chuk-hing

External links

1971 films
Hong Kong martial arts films
Wuxia films
Shaw Brothers Studio films
Works based on Juedai Shuangjiao
Films based on works by Gu Long
1970s Mandarin-language films
1970s Hong Kong films